Viega is a family owned international manufacturer of Plumbing and HVAC 
solutions.  Viega sells PEX for Radiant heating and 
plumbing systems along with copper, stainless, and metal alloy pipe along with mechanical pressure fitting products.

History
Founded in 1899 by Franz Viegener, Viega sold brass 
beer taps and moved into home plumbing products by 1901. In 1999 Viega started its North American operations headquartered in Wichita, Kansas with an Educational Facility in Nashua, New Hampshire opened in 2006 along with a plant in McPherson, Kansas in 2008 and Reno, Nevada in 2006. In 2016, Viega moved from Wichita to Broomfield, CO.

Innovation
In 1995 Viega presented press technology that joined copper and PEX tubing to plumbing fittings.  Products like Viega's ProPress and MANABLOC define a trend to mitigate installation errors.  Green or innovative buildings use Viega or other related products for radiant heating and snow melt applications. Reduction of water consumption increases the mixing of water tubing and pipe size to minimize the in process water to the user.

Viega has awards from ISH 2007 and 2008 ASPE Industry Award among others.  Viega builds to represent its products and innovation.

Products

ProPress
ProPress is a series of products based on copper pressed fittings.  These fittings do not require sweating copper pipe with tin and lead solder.

PureFlow MANABLOC
MANABLOC is a manifold type product that allows the management of fluids to plumbing fixtures.  Each leg of the manifold has a valve to enable maintenance.

ProRadiant
ProRadiant is a series of products to assist in the installation of radiant heating.  These products manage PEX tubing installation on or in a building floor.

Visign
Push button interfaces for bathroom controls.

Others
Round Design Grates, Quick Connect Gas Outlets

MegaPress
MegaPress is system for joining black iron pipe for use on SCH 5-40 suitable for natural gas and mechanical applications.  Fittings range in size from 1/2" - 4".

Markets
Viega has offices and or manufacturing plants in Germany, Denmark, Finland, Italy, Hungary, Netherlands, Norway, Poland, Sweden, Belgium, Canada, Australia, and the United States.

References

Heating, ventilation, and air conditioning companies
Companies based in North Rhine-Westphalia
Manufacturing companies established in 1899
Manufacturing companies of Germany
1899 establishments in Germany
German brands